The following is an episode list for the British children's animated television series Bob the Builder, which premiered on 15 May 1997. The series finale aired on 31 December 2011 as a mini series titled The Big Dino Dig, which ended the original series after 18 seasons.

Series overview

Original series (1999–2004)
The following series were originally shown on BBC One in the CBBC portion of the schedules. Bob the Builder is now on CBeebies, BBC Two, and Nick Jr. All episodes were produced by HOT Animation for HIT Entertainment.

Pilot (1997)

Season 1 (1999)

Season 2 (1999)

Season 3 (2000)

Season 4 (2001)

Season 5 (2002)

Season 6 (2002)

Season 7 (2003)

Season 8 (2003)

Season 9 (2004)

Project: Build It (2005–2008)
This show was centered around Bob and his crew's adventures in their new home of Sunflower Valley. Many new machines were introduced, and throughout the episodes Bob always tried to be eco-friendly. The show's intro begins with one of Bob's crew and one of other machines doing the job before Wendy and Bob wave good morning and begin their jobs. The show ends with Bob's crew going to sleep and Wendy and Bob waving good night before one of Bob's crew and one of other trucks does the job. All episodes were produced by HIT Entertainment, CBeebies, and PBS Kids. The spin-off began production in 2005 running through 2008.

Season 10 (2005)

Season 11 (2005)

Season 12 (2006)

Season 13 (2006)

Season 14 (2007)

Season 15 (2007)

Season 16 (2008)

Ready, Steady, Build!  (2010–2011)
The second spin-off is Bob the Builder: Ready, Steady, Build!. In June 2008, after production of Project: Build It wrapped up, it was announced that the series would be revamped for environmental CGI. The gang has now apparently moved to a place called Fixham Harbour and the show is now animated in CGI stop motion animation instead of the traditional stop-motion animation.

It features new characters that can move on water. The models have CGI faces. The characters from the previous spin-offs (like Gripper, Grabber, Splasher, Scrambler, Packer, and Ella) are still present. Bob's Parents, Benny, Zoomer, Sumsy, Tumbler, Flex, and Bristle appear to have their last appearance in Project: Build It currently. There's a segment called Bob's Jobs where a live action child appears on Bob's computer screen and needs help but Gripper and Grabber come in with stuff like rocks, crates, etc. and Bob finds out a safer way to use them. The series premiered every day on CBeebies between 12 April to 28 May 2010 and later between 26 September to 5 October 2011. This spin-off was produced by SD Entertainment.

Season 17 (2010)

Mini Series 1 - Season 18: The Legend of the Golden Hammer (2010)

Season 19 (2011)

Mini Series 2 - Season 20: The Big Dino Dig (2011)

Films

Original series

Project: Build It

Ready, Steady, Build!

Other
From 2004 to 2008, a number of 2-minute shorts, called Bob's Mini Projects, were aired in the United Kingdom, the United States, Canada, Latin America (Mexico, Argentina, Bolivia, Chile, Colombia, Ecuador, Paraguay, Peru, Uruguay, Venezuela, and others), Brazil, Australia, and New Zealand.

 Scoop and the Worms
 Rowdy Roley
 Lofty and the Otters
 Dizzy's Tree
 Wendy Weaves a Basket
 Muck's Water Butt
 Hedges and Holes
 Spud the Tree
 Recycling Pilchard
 Bob and the Hedgehogs
 Bob's Hammock
 Stepping Stones
 Bob and the Dry Stone Wall
 Sun Time
 Spud's Lunchbreak
 Bob's Birdfeeder
 Scoop's Reflections
 Spud's Toasted Marshmallows
 Roley the Worm Charmer
 Dizzy's Ducklings
 Scrambler the Shepherd
 Benny's Keepsake
 Benny's Animal Talk
 Hide and Tweet
 Scrambler's Off Road Team
 Bob's Poem
 Beach Music
 Shut that Gate
 It's Oh So Early
 Tumbler Cleans Up
 Finder Flex
 Bristle the Sheepdog

On Site (2008–2011)
Bob the Builder: On Site is a direct to video series production by HOT Animation in which Bob takes viewers and compares his projects to real world projects. Here is a list of videos from On Site:

Roads and Bridges (2008)
Houses and Playgrounds (2008)
Skyscrapers (2009)
Project Planet (2010)
Trains and Treehouses (2011)

Bob's Jobs
In Ready, Steady, Build! a series of shorts aired alongside it:

Bucket Planter (ft. Peyton Cloutier & Paige Cloutier)
Bird Feeding Table
Rock Garden
Wind-Proof Planter
Composting Bin
Wind Chimes
Kitty House
Bunny House
Rain Catcher
Squirrel Fun Course

References

External links
https://twitter.com/2005Robertson/status/1410700446562455558 Original Series UK Premiere Date
https://itunes.apple.com/gb/tv-season/bob-the-builder-series-3/id296703416 Series 3 UK Premiere Date
https://itunes.apple.com/gb/tv-season/bob-the-builder-series-4/id319964915 Series 4 UK Premiere Date
https://www.bbc.co.uk/search?q=scruffty%27s+big+dig&page=1 Series 5 UK Premiere Date
http://www.toonhound.com/buildit.htm Project Build It UK Premiere Date
https://www.youtube.com/watch?v=PhlLhuVu2WE UK Project: Build It Promo
http://www.tvmaze.com/shows/8208/bob-the-builder/episodes
https://web.archive.org/web/20031217091839/http://epguides.com/BobtheBuilder/ Nick Jr. titles
https://digiguide.tv/programme/Animation/Bob-the-Builder/10896/season-all/ Nick Jr. titles
https://www.kqed.org/tv/programs/archive/index.jsp?pgmid=13391&date=20050101 PBS Air Dates

Lists of British animated television series episodes
Lists of Nickelodeon television series episodes
Bob the Builder